The Service is an essay written in 1840 by Henry David Thoreau.  He submitted it to The Dial for publication, but they declined to print it. It was not published until after Thoreau's death.

The essay uses war and military discipline as metaphors that, as Thoreau would have it, can instruct us in how to order and conduct our lives.

Themes 

The Service is in part a contrarian swipe at the many pacifist writers and lecturers whose teachings on "nonresistance" were then very much in vogue, in part thanks to Christian anarchist and pacifist Adin Ballou who spoke on the subject at the Concord Lyceum on occasion and who founded the New England Non-Resistance Society (of which William Lloyd Garrison was also a leader, and a Lyceum speaker as well).

Thoreau debated the subject "Is it ever proper to offer forcible resistance?" in a formal Lyceum debate (arguing the affirmative) in 1841, and surviving records of the Lyceum note that the subject came up many times in debates, discussions, and lectures.

Thoreau's own views were very much influenced by these non-resistants, and are often confused with them even today.  When Amos Bronson Alcott resisted his taxes to protest war and slavery, three years before Thoreau would resist his taxes over the same issues, Alcott's action was explained within the context of "non-resistant" philosophy. When Thoreau explained his own tax resistance, he took pains to distinguish his theory from theirs, titling his essay Resistance to Civil Government.

In The Service, Thoreau tosses barbs at the non-resistance preachers, warning his readers that pacifism can be a temptation to passivity:

Note

On-line text 
 
 
 The Service at sniggle.net.

Printed sources 
 My Thoughts are Murder to the State by Henry David Thoreau
 The Service by Henry David Thoreau
 The Higher Law: Thoreau on Civil Disobedience and Reform
 Collected Essays and Poems by Henry David Thoreau

1840 essays
Essays by Henry David Thoreau